Lupus pernio is a chronic raised indurated (hardened) lesion of the skin, often purplish in color. It is seen on the nose, ears, cheeks, lips, and forehead. It is pathognomonic of sarcoidosis. The name "lupus pernio" is a misnomer, as microscopically this disease shows granulomatous infiltration and does not have features of either lupus nor pernio.

Lupus pernio is associated with poor outcomes and lower rates of resolution.

Lupus pernio and erythema nodosum are cutaneous manifestation of sarcoidosis, may suggest this disease as a cause of an associated dilated cardiomyopathy, especially with heart block, intraventricular conduction delay, or ventricular tachycardia.

See also 
 Sarcoidosis
 Skin manifestations of sarcoidosis
 List of cutaneous conditions

References

External links 

Monocyte- and macrophage-related cutaneous conditions
Autoimmune diseases